Oswaldocruzia panamaensis is a species of gastrointestinal nematode that completes its life cycle in lizards, first found in Panama.

References

Strongylida
Nematodes described in 2007